Demetrida moluccensis is a species of ground beetle in Lebiinae subfamily. It was described by Darlington in 1968 and is endemic to Indonesia.

References

Beetles described in 1968
Beetles of Indonesia
moluccensis